Fake or Not? is a 2020 Indian web show currently hosted by stand-up comedian and Youtuber Inder Sahani. The show is a Flipkart Video original and was launched on Flipkart App on 6th July 2020. Fake or Not is inspired by the United Nations 'Share Verified' campaign and aims to separate real news from fake news. In every episode, the host addresses five topics asking the question 'Fake or Real'.

The first season of Fake or Not? was hosted by Indian actress and comedian Mallika Dua who appeared as news anchor, Mythika Dutt.

Concept & show format 

Mallika Dua, who plays Mythika Dutt and is a News Anchor, is committed to tackling fake news and is using her show to help people identify real from fake. Each episode is 8-10 minutes long where she addresses 5 topics asking the question 'Fake or Real'.

The host gives some information on the topic and asks a question for which the viewers have graphics appear on screen -Fake or Real. She gives the audience 10 seconds to click on the answer they think is correct. She then goes onto debunking the myth or busting the fake news and informs the audience of the truth. Users can also win gratification by answering all 5 questions correctly.

See also 
 The Week That Wasn't
 On Air With AIB

References

External links 
 Flipkart Video on YouTube
 

Indian web series
Hindi-language web series
Indian game shows
2020 web series debuts
Quiz shows
2020 Indian television series debuts
Flipkart
Indian political television series
Current affairs shows
Television news in India
2020s television news shows
Entertainment news shows
News parodies
Indian television news anchors
Indian reality television series